Peter Baumgartner is a Swiss businessman, the senior strategic advisor to the group CEO of Etihad Aviation Group, and was the chief executive (CEO) of Etihad Airways from May 2016 to December 2017.

Early life
Baumgartner was born in Switzerland.

Career
He was promoted to Etihad chief operating officer (COO) in 2009.

In 2016, Baumgartner was named CEO of Etihad, taking over the day-to-day operational running of the airline.

Since July 2018, Baumgartner is senior strategic advisor to the group CEO of Etihad Aviation Group.

Personal life
He is married, and a fellow of the Royal Aeronautical Society.

Appointments 
In July 2018, Etihad CEO Douglas took over responsibility for the airline's main business, promoting former chief Peter Baumgartner to the position of special advisor.

Former Etihad Airways CEO Baumgartner started his new job as Senior Advisor for PA Consulting Group in February 2020. He was to help establish a new aviation advisory board.

Etihad 
In January 2017, the Etihad Airways management team consisted of Peter Baumgartner as CEO and Richard Hill as COO; James Hogan as CEO and CFO of the Etihad Group had resigned. Baumgartner stated that in May 2017, the partnership with the Special Olympics was a step forward for Etihad Avitation Group's social activities program. In November 2017, Baumgartner announced that the removal of the Dallas route was one of several adjustments made by Etihad's U.S. network in 2018. The same month, Baumgartner denied that Etihad was looking for investment opportunities in various airlines. As part of a strategic review supported by Baumgartner in January 2018, five Airbus A330 freighters were replaced with Boeing 777 aircraft.

In April 2018, in his opening remarks at AVSEC World Baumgartner revealed that the airline was proud to have a pre-clearance facility at Abu Dhabi International Airport. A month later, Etihad Airways upgraded its Paris flights to Airbus A380 aircraft, due to increased demand.
Tony Douglas took over the role of CEO from Peter Baumgartner in October 2019.

Conferences 
In 2019, following the introduction of Plug and Play's Travel and Hospitality Accelerator program, Baumgartner attended the press conference in Abu Dhabi.

Controversy 
In July 2020, the Court of Arbitration for Sport (CAS), lifted UEFA's 2018 Manchester City ban from the Champions League for violation of its financial fair play rules and judging that City's Abu Dhabi ownership had unfairly sponsored the club by channeling money through the state's commercial companies passing them on as independent sponsorship. CAS found that "most of the alleged breaches were either not established or time-barred" and at the same time reduced the club's fine by two thirds. However according to Spiegel, there were doubts about the CAS verdict as it emerged that in December 2013 City director Simon Pearce had sent an email to Baumgartner, with the subject "Payments". In this further leaked email from Pearce, who was also a senior executive in an Abu Dhabi government authority, to Baumgartner, Etihad's chief commercial officer at the time, Pearce confirmed that he was "forwarding" the airline GBP 91 million of GBP 99 million that Etihad owed to the club for its sponsorship, with Etihad merely providing GBP 8 million.

References

Living people
Swiss businesspeople
20th-century Swiss businesspeople
21st-century Swiss businesspeople
Year of birth missing (living people)